Western Transdanubia is a statistical (NUTS 2) region of Hungary. It is part of the Transdanubia (NUTS 1) region. Western Transdanubia includes the counties of Zala, Vas, and Győr-Moson-Sopron.

See also
List of regions of Hungary

References 

 
NUTS 2 statistical regions of the European Union